Dancesport was held at the 2019 Southeast Asian Games in the Philippines and was contested at the Royce Hotel and Casino at the Clark Freeport Zone in Mabalacat, Pampanga on 1 December 2019.

No medals were awarded for women's breakdance due to only two competitors qualifying the event. This was the first dancesport event at the Southeast Asian Games since 2007.

Medal table

Medalists

Standard

Latin American

Breaking

 Event was contested but no medals were awarded since there were only 2 competitors.

References

External links
 

2019 Southeast Asian Games events
2019
2019 in dancesport